Nekade Vo Nokta (in Macedonian Cyrillic: „Некаде во ноќта“) is the debut album by Macedonian singer Tose Proeski. The album was released in Macedonia by Avalon Production.

Track listing
"Tvoite baknezi na moite beli kosuli"	-  Твоите бакнежи на моите бели кошули
"Eh da sum zlato"		        -  Ех да сум злато
"Go molam neboto da mi te vrati"	-  Го молам небото да ми те врати		
"Skrsi me"	                        -  Скрши ме
"Posle dozdot doaga sonce"             -  После дождот доаѓа сонце
"Ruski Rulet" 	                        -  Руски рулет
"Pusti me"		                -  Пушти ме
"Ostani do kraj"			-  Остани до крај
"Pobegni"			        -  Побегни
"Sonce vo tvoite rusi kosi"		-  Сонце во твоите руси коси	
"Usni na usni"                         -  Усни на усни

Chart positions

Awards
Golden Lady Bug
 The Best Male Singer of the Year
 Album of the Year

References

1999 debut albums
Toše Proeski albums